Maxwell Charles Orr (9 January 1931 – 12 September 1955) was an Australian rules footballer who played with Melbourne in the Victorian Football League (VFL).

Family
The son of Charles Walter Orr (1872-1953), and Marjorie Elizabeth Bartlett Orr (1900-1998), née Beames, Maxwell Charles Orr was born at Ballarat on 9 January 1931.

He married Helen Ivy Mills in 1950.

Football
Orr, a half forward, played junior football for East Ballarat, before arriving in Melbourne.

He made five appearances for Melbourne in the 1952 VFL season but played only two games the following year.

In 1954 he returned to the country and began playing for the Ballarat Football Club.

Cricket
While in the city he was also a wicket-keeper for the MCC.

Death
On 12 September 1955, Orr died in a car accident on the Western Highway, near Melton, on his way to his home in Creswick.

The panel van he was driving collided with a semi trailer. His father was injured; but Orr, who was due to play for Ballarat in a semi final later that week, was killed instantly.

Notes

References

External links
 
 
 Max Orr at Demonwiki.

1931 births
Australian rules footballers from Victoria (Australia)
Melbourne Football Club players
East Ballarat Football Club players
Ballarat Football Club players
Melbourne Cricket Club cricketers
Road incident deaths in Victoria (Australia)
1955 deaths